Mono Prism was founded by David Del Sur during 2012 as a springboard for people involved in music, film, and print projects.

Their first production was a music video for the Gardens & Villa song "Spacetime" off of their 2011 release, Gardens & Villa (Secretly Canadian).

In 2013, Mono Prism Records released two albums for SISU, Light Eyes EP and Blood Tears LP. Mono Prism went on to produce live visuals for several SISU tours in support of Dirty Beaches, Crocodiles, and Cat Power.

They are based in the Lower East Side, New York City.

Music
SISU Blood Tears LP (2013) 
SISU "Blood Tears" Tape (2013, with Burger Records)
SISU Light Eyes EP (2013)

Videos
"Maximize" short documentary (2015)
SISU "Two Thousand Hands" (2013)
Gardens & Villa "Space Time" (2012)

References

External links
Mono Prism
Gardens & Villa
SISU

American artist groups and collectives
Anarchist collectives
Organizations based in Manhattan
Organizations established in 2012
2012 establishments in New York City